Melanocortin 4 receptor (MC4R) is a melanocortin receptor that in humans is encoded by the  gene. It encodes the MC4R protein, a G protein-coupled receptor (GPCR) that binds α-melanocyte stimulating hormone (α-MSH). In mouse models, MC4 receptors have been found to be involved in feeding behaviour, the regulation of metabolism, sexual behaviour, and male erectile function.

Clinical significance 
In 2009, two very large genome-wide association studies of body mass index (BMI) confirmed the association of variants about 150 kilobases downstream of the MC4R gene with insulin resistance, obesity, and other anthropometric traits. MC4R may also have clinical utility as a biomarker for predicting individual susceptibility to drug-induced adverse effects causing weight gain and related metabolic abnormalities. Another GWAS performed in 2012 identified twenty SNPs located ~190 Kb downstream of MC4R in association with severe antipsychotic-induced weight gain. This locus overlapped with the region previously identified in the 2009 studies. The rs489693 polymorphism, in particular, sustained a statistically robust signal across three replication cohorts and demonstrated consistent recessive effects. This finding was replicated again by another research group in the following year. In accordance with the above, MC4 receptor agonists have garnered interest as potential treatments for obesity and insulin resistance, while MC4 receptor antagonists have attracted interest as potential treatments for cachexia. The structures of the receptor in complex with the agonist setmelanotide and the antagonist SHU9119 have been determined.

MC4 receptor agonists like bremelanotide (PT-141), PL-6983, and PF-00446687 are under investigation as powerful potential treatments for both female and male sexual dysfunction, including hypoactive sexual desire disorder and erectile dysfunction. Bremelanotide and melanotan II are already used for sexual enhancement by the general population via their accessibility due to online drug vendors. The non-selective melanocortin receptor agonist afamelanotide (NDP-α-MSH) has been found to induce brain-derived neurotrophic factor (BDNF) expression in the rodent brain via activation of the MC4 receptor and mediate "intense" neurogenesis and cognitive recovery in an animal model of Alzheimer's disease. MC4 receptor antagonists produce pronounced antidepressant- and anxiolytic-like effects in animal models of depression and anxiety. And agonists of the MC4 receptor such as melanotan II and PF-00446687, via activation of the central oxytocin system, have been found to promote pair bond formation in prairie voles and, due to these prosocial effects, have been suggested as possible treatments for social deficits in autism spectrum disorders and schizophrenia.

In 2008, MC4R mutations were reported to be associated with inherited human obesity. They were found in heterozygotes, suggesting an autosomal dominant inheritance pattern. However, based on other research and observations, these mutations seem to have an incomplete penetrance and some degree of codominance. It has a prevalence of 1.0–2.5% in people with body mass indices greater than 30, making it the most commonly known genetic defect predisposing people to obesity.

In an exome-wide meta-analysis across three cohorts (UKB,GHS and MCPS), there were 16 genes for which there genetic variants was associated with BMI. 

Among the 16 genes, the analysis identified two for which rare mutations are known to cause monogenic obesity: MC4R and PCSK1 (proprotein convertase subtilisin/kexin type 1). One study provides genetic evidence linking  rare coding variation to BMI and obesity-related phenotypes.

MC4R gene mutations are associated with early-onset severe obesity they effect of mutations on opacity in these two heterozygous coding genes among mutations in the MC4R gene (C293R and S94N) are:

•	Rapid weight gains from early age (the most important feature).

•	Development of severe obesity (BMI ≫97th percentile) at early ages, usually <3 years of age.

•	Persistent food-seeking behavior, mostly reported from six months of age.

•	Parental/siblings anthropometric data: suspect if relatives present normal anthropometric data.

•	Tall stature/increased growth velocity (MC4R monogenic diabetes).
There is limited treatment options for the most common form of monogenic obesity,  MC4R mutations symptoms can be treated with a Glucagon-like Peptide-1 Receptor Agonist liraglutide which cause weight loss by reducing appetite. They found that the effects of liraglutide 3.0 mg daily for 16 weeks causes weight reducing and glucose lowering and may be relevant treatment in the most common form of monogenic obesity.

Interactions 

The MC4 receptor has been shown to interact with proopiomelanocortin (POMC). POMC is a precursor peptide pro-hormone which is cleaved into several other peptide hormones. All of the endogenous ligands of MC4 are produced by cleaving this one precursor peptide. These endogenous agonists include α-MSH, β-MSH, γ-MSH, and ACTH.

as a cofactor for ligand binding 
GPCRs can bind a wide variety of extracellular ligands including physiological cations.

Signaling along the phospholipase C pathway can significantly raise the intracellular  concentration, and this may constitute positive feedback from signaling of MC4 receptor or other receptors that result in  flux. This discovery highlights the plasticity and multipronged regulation and control of this receptor and will aid in next-generation structure-based drug design of therapeutics for MC4R-related obesity.

Ligands

Agonists

Non-selective
 α-MSH
 β-MSH
 γ-MSH
 ACTH
 Afamelanotide
 Bremelanotide
 Melanotan II
 Modimelanotide
 Setmelanotide  was approved by FDA as first-ever therapy for chronic weight management (IMCIVREE).The setmelanotide was advanced first-in-class, precision medicine that is designed to directly address the underlying cause of obesities driven by genetic deficits in the melanocortin-4 (MC4) receptor pathway.

Selective
 AZD2820
 LY-2112688
 MK-0493
 PF-00446687
 PG-931
 PL-6983
 Ro 27-3225 – also some activity at MC1
 THIQ

Antagonists

Non-selective
 Agouti-related peptide
 Agouti signalling peptide
 SHU-8914
 SHU-9005
 SHU-9119

Selective
 HS-014
 HS-024
 JKC-363
 MCL-0020
 MCL-0042 – also a serotonin reuptake inhibitor
 MCL-0129
 ML-00253764
 MPB-10

Unknown
 Semax

See also 
 Melanocortin receptor

References

Further reading

External links 
 

G protein-coupled receptors
Human proteins